Palloptera saltuum is a species of fly in the family Pallopteridae. It is found in the  Palearctic .

References

Pallopteridae
Insects described in 1758
Muscomorph flies of Europe
Taxa named by Carl Linnaeus